Elsa Felicya Gasser-Pfau (1896–1967) was a Polish-born Swiss economist. After earning a PhD in  Zurich in 1921, she settled in the city working as a journalist for the Neue Zürcher Zeitung. From the early 1930s, she became an advisor to Gottlieb Duttweiler, the founder of the Migros retail business. In 1948, she convinced him that the firm should introduce a self-service approach, paving the way for Switzerland's most successful supermarket chain. Today Gasser is considered to be responsible for the introduction of supermarkets in Switzerland.

Biography
Born in Krakow, Poland, on 6 June 1896, Elsa Felicya Pfau was the daughter of Hersch Ber Pfau. After completing her schooling in Krakow, she moved to Zurich where, after passing the Matura examination in 1915, she studied law and economics at the University of Zurich, earning a doctorate in political science in 1920.  In 1924, she married the judge Joseph Beat Gasser.

On graduating, Gasser worked at the Zurich Statistics Office and as a business reporter for the Neue Zürchner Zeitung. From 1932, she worked for Migros where she became Gottlied Duttweiler's chief advisor and later a member of the company's board. It is reported that Duttweiler never made an important decision without first consulting Gasser. When in the mid-1940s she first suggested Migros should open a self-service store, he was nevertheless skeptical but finally agreed. Self-service was introduced in 1946, soon representing two-thirds of the company's sales. Thanks to Gasser, Migros soon became Europe's leading retail company. The company also benefited from Gasser's initiative to integrate the Ex Libris approach to record sales, later contributing to the company's online services.

Elsa Gasser died in Zurich on 25 August 1967.

References

1896 births
1967 deaths
People from Kraków
People from Zürich
Swiss journalists
Swiss women journalists
Swiss economists
Swiss women economists
University of Zurich alumni
Swiss business executives
20th-century Swiss businesswomen
20th-century Swiss businesspeople
Emigrants from Congress Poland to Switzerland